Mafekhabl is a rural locality (an aul) in Kirovskoye Rural Settlement of Maykopsky District, Russia. The population was 140 as of 2018. There are 7 streets. The village was founded after the Circassians of Kosovo emigrated to the Republic of Adyghea in the Russian Federation as refugees due to the war.

References 

Rural localities in Maykopsky District